James Brodie of Brodie, 21st Thane and Chief of Clan Brodie, FRS FLS (31 August 1744 – 17 January 1824) was a Scottish politician and botanist. He was educated at Elgin Academy and St. Andrews University. He was returned to parliament in 1796 as MP for Elginshire, serving until 1807. He was appointed Lord Lieutenant of Nairn.

As a botanist, Brodie specialised in cryptogamic flora, i.e. plants which reproduce by spores, such as algae, ferns and mosses. He discovered a number of new species both around Edinburgh and on his own property at Brodie. His collection is now held at the Royal Botanic Garden Edinburgh. He corresponded with other eminent botanists of his time, including Sir William Jackson Hooker and Sir James Edward Smith. Brodie was elected a Fellow of the Linnaean Society in 1795, and of the Royal Society in 1797. The genus Brodiaea is named in his honour.

He married Lady Margaret Duff, sister of James Duff, 2nd Earl Fife, and had two sons and two daughters.

References

 
 

1744 births
1824 deaths
People from Moray
Alumni of the University of St Andrews
Scottish botanists
Phycologists
Bryologists
British pteridologists
Fellows of the Linnean Society of London
Fellows of the Royal Society
Scottish clan chiefs
Lord-Lieutenants of Nairn
Members of the Parliament of Great Britain for Scottish constituencies
British MPs 1796–1800
Members of the Parliament of the United Kingdom for Scottish constituencies
UK MPs 1801–1802
UK MPs 1802–1806
UK MPs 1806–1807
People educated at Elgin Academy, Moray